Ben or Benjamin Carr may refer to:

Ben Carr, actor in High Fidelity (film)
Benjamin Carr, musician

See also
5ive (American band) and The Mighty Mighty Bosstones, musical acts with unrelated members named Ben Carr.